Elections to Moyle District Council were held on 15 May 1985 on the same day as the other Northern Irish local government elections. The election used three district electoral areas to elect a total of 15 councillors.

Election results

Note: "Votes" are the first preference votes.

Districts summary

|- class="unsortable" align="centre"
!rowspan=2 align="left"|Ward
! % 
!Cllrs
! % 
!Cllrs
! %
!Cllrs
! %
!Cllrs
! % 
!Cllrs
!rowspan=2|TotalCllrs
|- class="unsortable" align="center"
!colspan=2 bgcolor="" | SDLP
!colspan=2 bgcolor="" | DUP
!colspan=2 bgcolor="" | UUP
!colspan=2 bgcolor="" | Sinn Féin
!colspan=2 bgcolor="white"| Others
|-
|align="left"|Ballycastle
|bgcolor="#99FF66"|28.5
|bgcolor="#99FF66"|1
|26.2
|1
|12.9
|1
|13.8
|1
|18.6
|1
|5
|-
|align="left"|Giant's Causeway
|0.0
|0
|bgcolor="#D46A4C"|41.8
|bgcolor="#D46A4C"|2
|29.1
|1
|0.0
|0
|29.1
|2
|5
|-
|align="left"|The Glens
|bgcolor="#99FF66"|56.4
|bgcolor="#99FF66"|3
|0.0
|0
|8.8
|0
|20.7
|1
|14.1
|1
|5
|-
|- class="unsortable" class="sortbottom" style="background:#C9C9C9"
|align="left"| Total
|30.4
|4
|21.0
|3
|16.2
|2
|12.2
|2
|20.2
|4
|15
|-
|}

District results

Ballycastle

1985: 1 x SDLP, 1 x DUP, 1 x UUP, 1 x Sinn Féin, 1 x Independent

Giant's Causeway

1985: 2 x Independent Unionist, 2 x DUP, 1 x UUP

The Glens

1985: 3 x SDLP, 1 x Sinn Féin, 1 x Independent Nationalist

References

Moyle District Council elections
Moyle